This page includes a list of biblical proper names that start with Z in English transcription. Some of the names are given with a proposed etymological meaning. For further information on the names included on the list, the reader may consult the sources listed below in the References and External Links.

A – B – C – D – E – F – G – H – I – J – K – L – M – N – O – P – Q – R – S – T – U – V – 
X --
Y – Z

Z

Zaanaim a., removings
Zaanannim
Zaavan, terror,
Zabad, gift
Zabbai, wanderer, pure pure
Zabbud, given, gift
Zabdi, Gift of Jehovah, my gift
Zabdiel, gift of God
Zaccai, pure
Zacchaeus, pure; clean; just
Zaccur, mindful
Zachariah, remembered by Jehovah, remembered by the Lord
Zacharias, the Lord has remembered, Greek form of Zechariah,
Zacher, memento; recollection; commemoration
Zadok, just righteous
Zaham, fatness
Zair, little, small
Zalaph, wound
Zalmon, shady,
Zalmonah, shady,
Zalmunna
Zamzummims
Zanoah, marsh
Zaphnath-paaneah, revealer of a secret, the man to whom secrets are revealed
Zarah
Zareathites
Zared
Zarephath
Zaretan
Zareth-shahar
Zarhites
Zartanah
Zarthan
Zatthu
Zattu
Zavan
Zaza
Zebadiah
Zebah
Zebaim
Zebedee, my gift
Zebina
Zeboiim
Zeboim
Zebudah
Zebul
Zebulonite
Zebulun, dwelling; habitation
Zebulunites
Zechariah
Zedad
Zedekiah
Zeeb
Zelah
Zelek
Zelophehad
Zelotes
Zelzah
Zemaraim
Zemarite
Zemira
Zenan
Zenas
Zephaniah
Zephath
Zephathah
Zephi, variant spelling of Zepho. A son of Eliphaz, grandson of Esau and one of the “dukes” of Edom.
Zepho, variant spelling of Zephi. A son of Eliphaz, grandson of Esau and one of the “dukes” of Edom.
Zephon
Zephonites
Zer
Zerah
Zerahiah
Zered
Zereda
Zeredathah
Zererath
Zeresh
Zereth
Zeri
Zeror
Zeruah
Zerubbabel
Zeruiah
Zetham
Zethan
Zethar
Zia
Ziba
Zibeon
Zibia
Zibiah
Zichri
Ziddim
Zidkijah
Zidon
Zidonians
Zif
Ziha
Ziklag
Zillah
Zilpah
Zilthai
Zimmah
Zimran
Zimri
Zin
Zina
Zion
Zior
Ziph
Ziphah
Ziphims
Ziphion
Ziphites
Ziphron
Zippor
Zipporah
Zithri
Ziz
Ziza
Zizah
Zoan
Zoar
Zoba
Zobah
Zobebah
Zohar
Zoheleth
Zoheth
Zophah
Zophai
Zophar
Zophim
Zorah
Zorathites
Zoreah
Zorites
Zorobabel
Zuar
Zuph
Zur
Zuriel
Zurishaddai
Zuzim

References
Comay, Joan, Who's Who in the Old Testament, Oxford University Press, 1971, 
Lockyer, Herbert, All the men of the Bible, Zondervan Publishing House (Grand Rapids, Michigan), 1958
Lockyer, Herbert, All the women of the Bible, Zondervan Publishing 1988, 
Lockyer, Herbert, All the Divine Names and Titles in the Bible, Zondervan Publishing 1988, 
Tischler, Nancy M., All things in the Bible: an encyclopedia of the biblical world , Greenwood Publishing, Westport, Conn. : 2006

Inline references 

Z